David A. B. Miller is the W. M. Keck Foundation Professor of Electrical Engineering at Stanford University, where he is also a Professor of Applied Physics by courtesy. His research interests include the use of optics in switching, interconnection, communications, computing, and sensing systems, physics and applications of quantum well optics and optoelectronics, and fundamental features and limits for optics and nanophotonics in communications and information processing.

Academic education 
Miller completed a BS degree in Physics from St. Andrews University and received his PhD in Physics in 1979 from Heriot-Watt University. In 1997 he was awarded an honorary doctorate from Vrije Universiteit, Brussel, and in 2003 he was awarded an honorary doctorate of engineering from Heriot-Watt University, Edinburgh.

Career
Following postdoctoral and lecturer positions at Heriot-Watt, Miller began working at AT&T Bell Laboratories in 1981 as a Member of Technical Staff, and from 1987 to 1996 was Department Head of the Advanced Photonics Research Department. In 1996 he joined Stanford's Department of Electrical Engineering as a professor. From 1997 to 2006 he was Director of the Ginzton Lab; and from 1997 to 2009, Director of the Solid State Photonics Lab. He is currently the W. M. Keck Professor of Electrical Engineering, and a Co-Director of the Stanford Photonics Research Center.

Since 2013, he has taught open online classes on Quantum Mechanics for Scientists and Engineers, attracting more than 30,000 student registrations.

Miller is a fellow of the Optical Society of America, the American Physical Society, and IEEE. He was elected to the National Academy of Sciences in 2008.

Miller is a Fellow of OSA, 
IEEE, American Physical Society (APS), and the Royal Societies of Edinburgh and Royal Society. He is a Member of the National Academy of Sciences and the National Academy of Engineering.

He was President of the IEEE Lasers and Electro-Optics Society (now IEEE Photonics Society) in 1995.

Research
Miller studies optical and optoelectronic devices including quantum wells and photonic nanostructures, especially for information sensing, communication, switching and processing. He also investigates more generally the fundamentals of optics in these applications, with current research including dense optical interconnection to silicon electronics, quantum well optical physics and devices, nanometallic photonics, and fundamental limits in optics.

He has published more than 270 scientific papers and wrote the textbook, "Quantum Mechanics for Scientists and Engineers". Miller holds 74 U.S. patents.

Awards and honors
 Carnegie Millennium Professorship, 2013
 Prize of the International Commission for Optics, 1991
 R. W. Wood Prize of the Optical Society of America, 1988 – with D. S. Chemla
 Adolph Lomb Medal of the Optical Society of America, 1986 
 H-index (August, 2018) – 99 (Google Scholar), 76 (Web of Science)

Books
Quantum Mechanics for Scientists and Engineers (Cambridge, 2008).

References

Links
 Personal website, Stanford University
 Research Group
 Google Scholar

1954 births
Living people
Stanford University Department of Electrical Engineering faculty
Fellows of Optica (society)
Fellow Members of the IEEE
Scottish expatriates in the United States
Fellows of the American Physical Society
Members of the United States National Academy of Sciences
Members of the United States National Academy of Engineering
Fellows of the Royal Society
Fellows of the Royal Society of Edinburgh
American nanotechnologists
Optical engineers